Sabal bermudana, commonly known as the Bermuda palmetto or bibby-tree, is one of 15 species of palm trees in the genus Sabal and is endemic to Bermuda although reportedly naturalized in the Leeward Islands. It was greatly affected by the introduction of non-native plants such as the Chinese fan palm, which created competition for space that it usually lost.

Description

It is a fan palm (Arecaceae tribe Corypheae), with the leaves with a bare petiole terminating in a rounded fan of numerous leaflets. It is extremely salt-tolerant and is often seen growing near the Atlantic Ocean coast in Bermuda, and also frost-tolerant, surviving short periods of temperatures as low as -14 °C, although no such temperatures have ever occurred in Bermuda.

Uses

Bermudians used to use, for a short period, the leaflets of the palm to weave into hats and export them to the United Kingdom and other countries. Sabal bermudana also had holes drilled into its trunk and sap extracted to make "bibby", a strong alcoholic beverage.

During the 17th century, most houses in Bermuda had palmetto-thatched roofs.

References

External links
200-year-old palm comes down in Edinburgh Botanics renovations BBC News

bermudana
Flora of Bermuda
Flora of the Leeward Islands
Plants described in 1934
Endangered plants
Taxa named by Liberty Hyde Bailey